U.S. Coast Guard Historic District is a national historic district located at Sullivan's Island, Charleston County, South Carolina. The district encompasses three contributing buildings and one contributing structure on Sullivan's Island.  The property was established as a life saving station in 1891.  The district contains the station house/administration building (c. 1891), boathouse (c. 1891), garage (c. 1938), and signal tower (c. 1938), which are laid out in an "L"-shaped court loosely organized around the bunker/sighting station (c. 1898). Also on the property is the non-contributing Charleston Light (ca. 1962).

It was listed on the National Register of Historic Places in 1973.

References

Historic districts on the National Register of Historic Places in South Carolina
Government buildings on the National Register of Historic Places in South Carolina
1891 establishments in South Carolina
Buildings and structures in Charleston County, South Carolina
National Register of Historic Places in Charleston County, South Carolina